The 11th IAAF World Indoor Championships in Athletics under the auspices of the International Association of Athletics Federations (IAAF) was held in Moscow from March 10 to March 12, 2006 in the Olimpiyski Sport arena.

The announcement by the IAAF in November 2003 was a blow to Madrid, which was also in the running to hold the event but Spain had already held the competition twice. This was the first major senior athletics competition to be held in the country since the highly boycotted 1980 Summer Olympics.

The majority of athletes from Great Britain, Australia and Jamaica, amongst other countries, did not attend the Championships, due to the coinciding 2006 Commonwealth Games.

Results

Men
2003 | 2004 | 2006 | 2008 | 2010

Women
2003 | 2004 | 2006 | 2008 | 2010

† Tatyana Kotova was the original winner with 7.00m, but was stripped of the title in 2013 after retested samples from the 2005 World Championships found her to have been doping. All her results from August 2005 to July 2007 were subsequently annulled.

Medal table

Participating nations

 (2)
 (2)
 (1)
 (1)
 (1)
 (3)
 (1)
 (7)
 (4)
 (9)
 (3)
 (1)
 (1)
 (1)
 (14)
 (9)
 (1)
 (2)
 (1)
 (11)
 (2)
 (2)
 (1)
 (2)
 (2)
 (11)
 (1)
 (7)
 (3)
 (1)
 (6)
 (1)
 (6)
 (4)
 (25)
 (1)
 (1)
 (16)
 (2)
 (14)
 (3)
 (1)
 (1)
 (2)
 (3)
 (1)
 (1)
 (3)
 (1)
 (1)
 (1)
 (1)
 (9)
 (1)
 (14)
 (18)
 (3)
 (1)
 (3)
 (6)
 (2)
 (1)
 (3)
 (1)
 (2)
 (1)
 (2)
 (1)
 (1)
 (1)
 (1)
 (1)
 (1)
 (8)
 (1)
 (1)
 (5)
 (1)
 (4)
 (1)
 (1)
 (1)
 (1)
 (1)
 (1)
 (1)
 (1)
 (21)
 (3)
 (2)
 (5)
 (1)
 (15)
 (57)
 (1)
 (1)
 (1)
 (1)
 (1)
 (1)
 (1)
 (2)
 (1)
 (1)
 (3)
 (4)
 (1)
 (4)
 (1)
 (19)
 (1)
 (13)
 (2)
 (1)
 (1)
 (1)
 (1)
 (2)
 (3)
 (1)
 (1)
 (1)
 (27)
 (51)
 (1)
 (1)
 (2)
 (1)
 (1)

External links
 2006 Championships Official site
IAAF site

References

 
World Athletics Indoor Championships
IAAF World Indoor Championships
IAAF World Indoor Championships
International athletics competitions hosted by Russia
IAAF World Indoor Championships
IAAF World Indoor Championships
Sports competitions in Moscow
Athletics in Moscow